Daughter of the Night is a German drama film directed by Richard Eichberg. The film is about a French aristocrat who falls in love with a Russian nightclub singer, and his attraction to her involves him in a Russian revolutionary movement.

The film was released in two parts: as Sybil Joung and Der Tod des Großfürsten. It received positive reviews from German publications Film und Brettl and Deutsche Lichtspiel-Zeitung.

A condensed version of the film was released in the United States in 1921 as Daughter of the Night. This shortened American print is within the collection of the George Eastman House.

Cast
Cast adapted from Filmportal.de.

Release
Der Tanz auf dem Vulkan was released in two parts at UFA-Filmpalast   in Germany: as Sybil Joung and Der Tod des Großfürsten. It premiered in late February 1920.

A shortened version of the film was released in the United States in 1921 as Daughter of the Night. This American print is in the collection of the George Eastman House.

Reception
From contemporary reviews, a reviewer in Film und Brettl stated that director Richard Eichberg "has unquestionably provided proof of his immense talent as director of this two-part cinematic work" noting that "the plot is full of action and in that respect does justice to the medium of film." The Deutsche Lichtspiel-Zeitung also praised the film, finding it a "large-scale production, which merely constitutes a prelude to Part Two, possesses all the qualities of a good commercial picture with international potential."

See also
 Bela Lugosi filmography
 List of rediscovered films

References

Sources

External links

1920 films
German black-and-white films
German silent feature films
Films of the Weimar Republic
Films directed by Richard Eichberg
1920s rediscovered films
German drama films
1920 drama films
Rediscovered German films
Silent drama films
1920s German films